This is a list of lighthouses in Liberia.

Lighthouses

See also
List of lighthouses in Sierra Leone (to the north)
List of lighthouses in Ivory Coast (to the east)
 Lists of lighthouses and lightvessels

References

External links

Liberia
Lighthouses
Lighthouses